Owneq Yelqi-ye Olya (also Romanized as Owneq Yelqī-ye ‘Olyā; also known as Ūneq Yelqī-ye Bālā) is a village in Aq Altin Rural District, in the Central District of Aqqala County, Golestan Province, Iran. At the 2006 census, its population was 1,193, in 245 families.

References 

Populated places in Aqqala County